The Cambridge Guide to English Usage by Pam Peters is a usage dictionary, giving an up-to-date account of the debatable issues of English usage and written style. It is based on extensive, up-to-date corpus data rather than on the author's personal intuition or prejudice, and differentiates among US, UK, Canadian and Australian usages. British lexicographer Sidney Landau remarked:

See also 
 A Dictionary of Modern English Usage by Fowler
 List of English words with disputed usage

References 
 CUP catalogue entry (contains reviews as well)

English dictionaries
Style guides